Limonium latifolium can refer to:

Limonium latifolium , a synonym of Goniolimon tataricum  subsp. tataricum
Limonium latifolium , a synonym of Limonium platyphyllum